The 2010 Piala Indonesia Final was a football match that took place on 1 August 2010 at Manahan Stadium in Solo. It was the fifth final of Piala Indonesia and contested by Sriwijaya FC and Arema Indonesia. It was a third successive Piala Indonesia final for Sriwijaya, and Arema's third overall having won their last two finals in 2005 and 2006. 

Sriwijaya won the match 2–1 to claim their third consecutive Piala Indonesia title and entry to the 2011 AFC Champions League qualifying play-off.

Road to the final

Note: In all results below, the score of the finalist is given first (H: home; A: away).

Match details

See also
2010 Piala Indonesia

References

External links
Official site Liga Indonesia

2010 Final
2010–11 in Indonesian football
|}